The Dayton Wolfpack were a professional indoor football team and a charter member of the National Arena League (NAL) in its inaugural 2017 season.  Originally to be based in Dayton, Ohio, the Wolfpack had announced their home venue as the Nutter Center but apparently failed to reach a lease agreement. The Wolfpack were then listed as a traveling team by the NAL.

The Wolfpack would have been the sixth indoor football team to call Dayton home, following the Dayton Skyhawks of the original Indoor Football League (1999–2000), the Dayton Warbirds/Bulldogs of the National Indoor Football League (2005–2006), The Marshals also of the NIFL (2007), the Dayton Silverbacks of the Continental Indoor Football League (2011–2012) and finally the Dayton Sharks also of the CIFL (2013–2014).

History
On August 11, 2016, the Arena Developmental League (which then became the National Arena League) officially announced the Wolfpack as its fourth charter team, following the previously announced Columbus Lions, High Country Grizzlies and Lehigh Valley Steelhawks. The team was originally announced to be led by head coach Derrick Shepard and owners Jerome and Jesse Clark.

Over social media, the owners of the Wolfpack announced they would be playing at the Nutter Center and the NAL made the schedule listing the Nutter as their home venue. Due to the Jacksonville Sharks needing to fulfill their previous eight home contract with their arena from their time in the Arena Football League, the Wolfpack and Corpus Christi Rage each were only scheduled for five home games, with four home games of the Wolfpack's falling on a Monday. However, by February 2017, several signed players reported over social media that they had all been released from their contracts due to lack of a home venue. By February 20, the NAL had removed their home games from the schedule, leaving the Wolfpack as a traveling team. Also over social media, Marcus Ray announced he would be operating the Wolfpack traveling team out of the Atlanta area for the season.

Later in the season, Erasmus Harvey announced his new team, the Georgia Doom, would play the Georgia Firebirds as the Dayton Wolfpack for the April 29 game in Albany.

The Wolfpack were not listed as members of the league after the NAL 2017 summer meetings concluded.

Season-by-season results

2017 season

Schedule
Key: 

All start times were local time

Roster

References

External links
Dayton Wolfpack official website

American football teams in Dayton, Ohio
Defunct American football teams in Ohio
Defunct indoor American football teams
National Arena League teams
American football teams established in 2016
American football teams disestablished in 2017
2016 establishments in Ohio
2017 disestablishments in Ohio